Krzywe Koło-Kolonia  is a settlement in the administrative district of Gmina Suchy Dąb, within Gdańsk County, Pomeranian Voivodeship, in northern Poland.

For details of the history of the region, see History of Pomerania.

References

Villages in Gdańsk County